Alhambra College Preparatory High School was a public charter high school in west Phoenix, Arizona. It was operated by the Alhambra Education Foundation, and the charter holder was the Alhambra Education Partnership. Both organizations were extensions of the Alhambra Elementary School District. The school closed after the 2010-2011 school year amidst decreasing funding and lower than expected student enrollment.

References

High schools in Phoenix, Arizona
Educational institutions established in 2009
Educational institutions disestablished in 2011
Former high schools in Arizona
2009 establishments in Arizona
2011 disestablishments in Arizona